The Middle Branch of the Little Magalloway River is a  river in northern New Hampshire and northwestern Maine in the United States. It is a tributary of the Little Magalloway River, located in the Androscoggin River watershed of Maine and New Hampshire.

The river rises in Pittsburg, New Hampshire, south of  Prospect Mountain, and flows east into Maine.

See also

List of rivers of New Hampshire
List of rivers of Maine

References

Tributaries of the Kennebec River
Rivers of Maine
Rivers of New Hampshire
Rivers of Oxford County, Maine
Rivers of Coös County, New Hampshire